The 1977 Aviateca Convair 240 airplane crash was a scheduled Aviateca passenger flight that crashed near Guatemala City, Guatemala on April 27, 1977. All 28 people on board survived, but the aircraft was destroyed.

Final moments
The aircraft, a Convair 240, took off from La Aurora International Airport (GUA/MGGT) in Guatemala City as scheduled. During the initial climb to cruise altitude, the number one engine suffered a failure due to oil loss. The crew was unable to feather the propeller, and was forced to attempt an emergency landing in rough terrain. The plane was destroyed in the attempt, but none of the 22 passengers and six crew on board were killed.

Investigation
The government of Guatemala initiated a full investigation. It found that the aircraft had undergone maintenance shortly before the flight. In order to perform the maintenance, it was necessary to disconnect a high-pressure oil hose from the engine cylinders. The hose was not correctly reattached, thus starving the engine of oil.

References

External links
  (includes picture of accident aircraft)

Accidents and incidents involving the Convair CV-240 family
Airliner accidents and incidents caused by maintenance errors
Aviation accidents and incidents in 1977
Aviation accidents and incidents in Guatemala
Avianca Guatemala accidents and incidents
1977 in Guatemala
April 1977 events in North America